This is a list of number-one songs in 1984 on the Italian charts compiled weekly by the Italian Hit Parade Singles Chart.

Chart history

Number-one artists

References

1984
1984 in Italian music
1984 record charts